Houlton International Airport  is a public-use airport located in the town of Houlton in Aroostook County, Maine, United States, near the town border of Hodgdon, Maine, also on the border of New Brunswick, Canada. This general aviation airport is publicly owned by the town of Houlton. It once had scheduled airline service on Northeast Airlines.

The airport originated as Houlton Army Air Base. Prior to the United States' entry into World War II, American army pilots flew planes to the base. They could not fly the planes directly into Canada, a member of the British Commonwealth, because that would violate the official United States position of neutrality.  Local farmers used their tractors to tow the planes into Canada, where the Canadians closed the Woodstock highway so that aircraft could use it as a runway.

From October 1944 to May 1946, the air base housed Camp Houlton, a prisoner-of-war camp.

Facilities

 Runway 5/23: 5,001 x 150 ft (1,524 x 46 m), surface: asphalt
 Runway 1/19: 2,600 x 100 ft (793 x 30.5 m), surface: asphalt

See also

 Maine World War II Army Airfields
 Air Transport Command

References

External links

Airports established in 1944
Airports in Aroostook County, Maine
Buildings and structures in Houlton, Maine
Airfields of the United States Army Air Forces in Maine
Airfields of the United States Army Air Forces Air Transport Command on the North Atlantic Route
Airfields of the United States Army Air Forces Technical Service Command